Máel Ísu, Maol Íosa or Máel Íosa, meaning devotee of Jesus, Latinised as Malise, may refer to:

 Máel Ísu I of Cennrígmonaid, 10th century bishop of Cennrígmonaid
 Máel Ísu II of Cennrígmonaid, late 10th-early 11th century bishop of Cennrígmonaid
 Máel Ísu Ua hAinmere, 12th century Archbishop of Cashel and Bishop of Waterford
 Máel Ísu Ua Fogluda, 12th century Archbishop of Cashel 
 Máel Ísu I, Earl of Strathearn, 12th century Scottish mormaer
 Maol Íosa II, Earl of Strathearn (d. 1271), Scottish mormaer
 Maol Íosa III, Earl of Strathearn (d. 1312), Scottish mormaer
 Maol Íosa IV, Earl of Strathearn (d. 1329), Scottish mormaer
 Maol Íosa V, Earl of Strathearn (d. 1350), Scottish mormaer and Norwegian Jarl
 Malise Sparre (d.1391), grandson of the above, competitor for the Jarldom of Orkney
 Malise mac Gilleain, 13th century Scottish clan chief
 Malise Graham, 1st Earl of Menteith (d. 1490), Scottish nobleman
 Malise Ruthven (b. 1942), Irish academic
 Mael Isu Bratain Ui Echach (fl. 1130), 12th century Irish Master goldsmith (see Cross of Cong, Shrine of Manchan).
Maolíosa McHugh (born 20th century), Sinn Féin politician